When may refer to:
 When?, one of the Five Ws, questions used in journalism
 WHEN (AM), an Urban Adult Contemporary radio station in Syracuse, New York
 WHEN-TV, the former call letters of TV station WTVH in Syracuse, New York

Music 
 When (band), a musical project of Norwegian artist Lars Pedersen
 When! Records, a UK record label whose artists include Rob Overseer

Albums 
 When (album), by Vincent Gallo, or the title song, 2001

Songs 
 "When" (The Kalin Twins song), 1958
 "When" (Red Vincent Hurley song), the Irish entry for Eurovision 1976
 "When" (Shania Twain song), 1998
 "When", by Amanda Lear from Diamonds for Breakfast, 1980
 "When", by Dodie from Intertwined, 2016
 "When", by Megadeth from The World Needs a Hero, 2001
 "When", by Opeth from My Arms, Your Hearse, 1998
 "When", by Perry Como, 1980
 "When", by Rostam from Half-Light, 2017
 "When?", by Spirit from Spirit of '76, 1975
 "When", by Taproot from Welcome, 2002